Flock Safety is an American company that sells Automated License Plate Recognition technology  (ALPR) to law enforcement agencies and neighbourhood associations. The cameras read license plates and sent instant alerts to law enforcement officers when the cameras identify license plates that match those on lists of cars that are stolen or otherwise of interest to the police. Private citizens and businesses who own one of Flock's cameras can use their own hot lists. Unlike many other ALPR systems, Flock cameras also allow searches based on the car's colour and various other visual features.

History 
Flock was founded in 2017 and has grown rapidly. As of February 2022, Flock's fixed cameras have been installed in over 1500 cities across the US.

Products and services 
Cameras include the Sparrow, which does not send instant alerts, and the Falcon, which does. The Raven is an audio device that detects gunshots. Data can be shared between law enforcement agencies. The company hosts "transparency portals" like this one for Piedmont in California showing how data is used.

Controversy 
While thousands of communities have adopted the cameras without debate, a few communities have had heated debates about whether Flock Safety cameras will protect the community or cause harm, especially to minorities. The Electronic Frontier Foundation argues that ALPRs like Flock may create more problems than they solve. Flock Safety cameras and technology only captures data from vehicles and the machine learning is specifically designed not to identify people. Although Flock Safety claims their cameras reduce crime, opponents argue that there is no clear evidence for this. The American Civil Liberties Union released a report in March 2022 criticising both Flock Safety's business model and its products.

References 

Technology companies of the United States
Automatic number plate recognition